Sabat M. Islambouli (1867 – 1941) was one of the first Kurdish female physicians from Syria. She was born to a Kurdish Syrian family. She has had variations of the spelling of her name and is also known as Sabat Islambooly, Tabat Islambouly, Tabat Istanbuli, Thabat Islambooly and more.

Medical training 
Islambouli studied at the Woman's Medical College of Pennsylvania in the USA.  She graduated with her medical degree in 1890.

Later life 
Islambouli is believed to have gone back to Damascus after she graduated, and then to Cairo in 1919 according to the college's alumnae list. After that, the college lost touch with her. Little is known of what happened to her once she left the United States. She died in 1941.

References 

1860s births
Year of birth unknown
1941 deaths
Woman's Medical College of Pennsylvania alumni
Syrian physicians
20th-century Syrian people
Syrian women physicians
Kurdish Jews
19th-century women physicians